Parliamentary elections were held in Morocco on 14 September 1984, having originally been scheduled for September 1983, but postponed due to issues over the future of Western Sahara. The number of directly elected seats increased from 176 to 199, whilst the number of indirectly elected seats rose from 88 to 102 (60 elected by local councillors, 32 by professional bodies and 10 by workers' organisations). The indirectly elected seats were chosen on 2 October.

Twelve parties and 1,333 candidates contested the election. The result was a victory for the Constitutional Union, which won 82 of the 301 seats. Voter turnout was 67.4%.

Results

References

Morocco
1984 in Morocco
Elections in Morocco
Election and referendum articles with incomplete results